The New England Classic was a golf tournament on the PGA Tour from 1969 through 1998.  It was held under various names at Pleasant Valley Country Club in Sutton, Massachusetts.

Tournament highlights
1975: Roger Maltbie wins for the second consecutive week on the PGA Tour. He beats Mac McLendon by one shot. Afterwards, Maltbie left his $40,000 winner's check behind in a bar.
1977: Due to the PGA Tour labeling it a 'designated event', Jack Nicklaus plays in the tournament for the first and only time. He finishes in second place two shots behind winner Raymond Floyd.
1978: One week after winning the PGA Championship, John Mahaffey also takes home the American Optical Classic title. He beats defending champion Raymond Floyd and the PGA Tour's only optometrist, Gil Morgan, by two shots. 
1986: Gene Sauers defeats Blaine McCallister on the third hole of a sudden death playoff for his first ever PGA Tour title after having to hole a par chip on the first playoff hole to avoid elimination.
1989: Three years after suffering a tough luck playoff loss at Pleasant Valley, Blaine McCallister birdies the final two holes to win the 21st edition of the tournament by one shot over Brad Faxon.   
1998: Steve Pate wins the last edition of the tournament. He beat Scott Hoch and Bradley Hughes by one shot. For Pate it was his first victory since a 1996 car accident.

Winners

See also
CVS Caremark Charity Classic - an unofficial PGA Tour event that used the CVS Charity Classic name
 Deutsche Bank Championship - a PGA Tour event held in greater Boston since 2003.

Notes

References

External links
Pleasant Valley Country Club official site

1969 establishments in Massachusetts
1998 disestablishments in Massachusetts
Former PGA Tour events
Golf in Massachusetts
History of Worcester County, Massachusetts
Recurring sporting events established in 1969
Recurring sporting events disestablished in 1998
Sports competitions in Massachusetts
Sports in Worcester County, Massachusetts
Sutton, Massachusetts
Tourist attractions in Worcester County, Massachusetts